Néstor Fabián Bareiro Leguizamón (born 11 December 1983 in Fernando de la Mora) is a Paraguayan footballer forward who plays for Club Fernando de la Mora.

Career
Bareiro began his career playing for Club Fernando de la Mora of the Paraguayan Second Division and made his debut in 2006. He played the first semester of 2007 in Nacional and also played the second semester in 12 de Octubre.

In 2008, he moved to Deportes Concepción of Chile where along with Daud Gazale, scored 13 goals for the team (3 Bareiro and 10 Gazale).

In Torneo Clausura 2008, Bareiro scored 16 goals in 20 matches playing for O'Higgins F.C. and was the top-scorer of the regular phase of the tournament together with Gastón Cellerino of Rangers de Talca with 16 goals.

In 2009, thanks for the good tournament of Bareiro in the last year, he received an offer of the Mexican club San Luis F.C., and he signed. In this club he made an irregular season, playing 12 matches and not scoring goals.

In the second semester of 2009, Bareiro signed with Municipal Iquique, but unfortunately his team was relegated to the Second Division of Chile.

In 2010, he signed for Sportivo Luqueño. Subsequently, for the second half of the year, he joined Olimpo, recently promoted to the Argentine Primera División.

On 15 January of Paraguay's 2022 summer transfer window, Bareiro completed a transfer to Deportivo Recoleta.

References

External links

1984 births
Living people
Paraguayan footballers
Paraguayan expatriate footballers
Deportes Concepción (Chile) footballers
O'Higgins F.C. footballers
Deportes Iquique footballers
Rosario Central footballers
Sportivo Luqueño players
Club Olimpia footballers
Olimpo footballers
San Luis F.C. players
Liga MX players
Chilean Primera División players
Paraguayan Primera División players
Argentine Primera División players
Primera Nacional players
Expatriate footballers in Argentina
Expatriate footballers in Chile
Expatriate footballers in Mexico
Expatriate footballers in Venezuela
Association football forwards